Clarke Glacier  is an 8 mile long glacier that drains from Coulter Heights to Hull Bay.  It was named in 2003 by Advisory Committee on Antarctic Names (US-ACAN).

It was named after Theodore S. Clarke, a University of Wisconsin–Madison geophysicist whose research in the 1990s focused on theoretical and field analysis of the ice stream area of West Antarctica.

See also
 List of glaciers in the Antarctic
 Geography of Antarctica
 Geology of Antarctica
 Glaciology

References 
This article incorporates text in the public domain from the United States Department of the Interior.

External links 

Glaciers of Marie Byrd Land